Lena Samuelsson is a Swedish ski-orienteering competitor. She won a bronze medal in the classic distance at the 1975 World Ski Orienteering Championships in Hyvinkää, and a silver medal in the relay.

References

Swedish orienteers
Female orienteers
Ski-orienteers
Year of birth missing (living people)
Living people